The 1991 Labatt Brier, the Canadian men's curling championship, was held from March 3 to 10 in Hamilton, Ontario. The 1991 Brier also constituted the trials that decided the Canadian men's representatives for the curling tournament at the 1992 Winter Olympics.

In the final, Kevin Martin of Alberta defeated Randy Woytowich of Saskatchewan to win his first Brier.

Teams

Round robin standings

Round robin results

Draw 1

Draw 2

Draw 3

Draw 4

Draw 5

Draw 6

Draw 7

Draw 8

Draw 9

Draw 10

Draw 11

Tiebreaker

Playoffs

Semifinal

Final

Statistics

Top 5 player percentages
Round Robin only

Team percentages
Round Robin only

References

Sports competitions in Hamilton, Ontario
1991
1991 in Canadian curling
Curling in Ontario
1991 in Ontario
20th century in Hamilton, Ontario